There is a community of Serbs in Russia, also known as Russian Serbs, which includes Russian citizens of ethnic Serb descent or Serbian-born people residing in the country.

History

Middle Ages 
After the Ottoman invasion of Serbia in the 14th century, Serbian refugees found refuge in Russia. Lazar the Serb (built the first mechanical public clock in Russia) and Pachomius the Serb (hagiographer and translator) were some of the notable Serbs in Russian medieval history. Elena Glinskaya (1510–1538), the mother of Russian emperor Ivan the Terrible (r. 1547–84), was maternally Serbian. The Orthodox worship of Saint Sava was established in Russia in the 16th century.

Russian Empire 
In the 1750s, in a re-settlement initiated by Austrian Colonel Ivan Horvat, a vast number of Orthodox Serbs, mostly from territories controlled by the Habsburg monarchy (the Serbian Grenzers), settled in Russia's military frontier region of New Serbia (with the centre in Novomirgorod, mainly in the territory of present-day Kirovohrad Oblast of Ukraine), as well as in Slavo-Serbia (now mainly the territory of the Luhansk Oblast of Ukraine). In 1764, both territorial entities were incorporated in Russia's Novorossiya Governorate. Serbs continued to settle in Russian lands, and many, such as Sava Vladislavich, Nikolay Depreradovich, and Peter Tekeli, became high ranking generals and imperial nobility.

During the Napoleonic Wars, many Russian generals were either Serbian-born or of Serbian descent, including Georgi Emmanuel, Peter Ivelich, Nikolay Vuich, Ivan Shevich, and multiple others. The most esteemed Serb in the service of the Russian Empire at the time of the Napoleonic Wars was Count Mikhail Miloradovich, a leading commander during the French invasion of Russia and governor-general of Saint Petersburg.

Soviet Union 
Throughout the existence of the Soviet Union, many Serbs in Russia continued to play prominent roles in society. Notable figures at the time include Admiral of the Fleet and Hero of the Soviet Union Nikolai Kuznetsov and renowned sculptor and Hero of Socialist Labour Yevgeny Vuchetich, responsible for The Motherland Calls, which was the largest statue in the world at the time of its construction.

Notable people

Nobility and military personnel 
Ivan the Terrible, Tsar of All-Russia from 1547 to 1584.
Elena Glinskaya, Grand Princess consort of Moscow and Regent of Russia in the 16th century
Sava Vladislavich, Serbian diplomat, count, and merchant-adventurer in the employ of Peter the Great who conducted important diplomatic negotiations in Constantinople, Rome, and Beijing

Dmitry Horvat, Imperial Russian lieutenant-general and great-grandson of Jovan Horvat, the founder of New Serbia in Imperial Russia
Semyon Zorich, Imperial Russian lieutenant-general and count of the Holy Roman Empire
Jovan Horvat founded New Serbia by the right bank of the Donets River between the Bakhmut and Luhan River.

Rajko Depreradović one of the founders of Slavo-Serbia in the early 1750s
Jovan Šević one of the founders of Slavo-Serbia
Peter Tekeli, General-in-Chief of the Russian army
Andrei Miloradovich, 18th century general and statesman
Count Marko Ivelich, 18th and early 19th century general
Count Mikhail Miloradovich, a general prominent during the Napoleonic Wars, best known for defeating Joachim Murat. 
Ivan Shevich, general in the Napoleonic Wars
Count Georgi Emmanuel, general of the Napoleonic Wars
Ivan Adamovich, general of the Napoleonic Wars
Nikolay Bogdanov, general of the Napoleonic Wars
Peter Mikhailovich Kaptzevich, general of the Napoleonic Wars
Baron Ilya Duka, general who fought in the Napoleonic Wars
Nikolay Depreradovich, general of the Napoleonic Wars
Peter Ivelich, general of the Napoleonic Wars
Nikolay Vuich, general of the Napoleonic Wars
Ivan Yankovich, general of the Napoleonic Wars
Jeremija Gagić, diplomat in the service of the Russian Empire, ennobled by Nicholas I
Dejan Subotić, a Serbo-Russian military and state leader
Nikolai Dimitrievich Dabić, Vice-admiral of the Russian Imperial Navy, died in 1908 from wounds sustained in the Russo-Japanese War
Marko Vojnović, Admiral of the Russian Imperial Navy, one of the founders of the Black Sea Fleet
Jovan Albanez, commander of the Serbian Hussar Regiment.
Anto Gvozdenović, Russian commander and ambassador.
Simeon Piščević, Austrian and Russian general major.
Mikhail Mirkovich, military general and ethnographer 
Nazary Alexandrovich Karazin, an Imperial Russian officer, came from a family of Greek and Serbian origin. 
Vasily Karazin later worked on educational reforms and founded The Ministry of National Education in Russian Empire. He is also the founder of Kharkiv University.

Alexander Knyazhevich, Finance Minister of Imperial Russia, 1858–1862
Dmitry Knyazhevich, soldier and Olympic fencer
Nikolay Gerasimovich Kuznetsov, Admiral of the fleet of the Soviet Union
Natalia Poklonskaya, Deputy of the State Duma of the Russian Federation

Clergy 
John of Shanghai and San Francisco,  Eastern Orthodox ascetic and hierarch of the Russian Orthodox Church Outside Russia
John of Tobolsk, Metropolitan of Tobolsk, who became a saint
Nikodim Milaš, Bishop of Dalmatia and expert in canon law who studied at the Kievan Theological Academy, among other institutions of learning.
Lazar the Serb, one of the earliest inventors of clocks. 
Pachomius the Serb, Serbian and Russian hagiographer.
Simeon Končarević Orthodox bishop

Sportspeople 
Aleksandra Krunić, professional tennis player
Vesna Dolonc, professional tennis player

Dmitry Knyazhevich, Olympic fencer and military general

Admirals
 Marko Voinovich
 Marko Ivelich
 Nikolai Kuznetsov
 Nikolai Dimitrievich Dabić

Other 
Andrej Dudrovich, Russian philosopher, professor and Rector of Kharkiv University.
Aleksej Jelačić, Russian-born Serbian historian.
Stefano Zannowich, Writer and adventurer, a contemporary of Casanova.
Atanasije Stojković, Serbian writer and one of the first professors at Kharkiv University. He is considered the founder of the Russian meteoritics.
Miloš Marić, biologist and head of the department of histology at Saratov State University. Brother of Mileva Marić.
Teodor Filipović, Serbian writer and one of the first professors at Kharkiv University.
Gligorije Trlajić, Serbian writer, poet, polyglot and professor of law at the universities of St. Petersburg and Kharkiv
Teodor Janković-Mirijevski, educational reformer
Yevgeny Vuchetich, a prominent Soviet sculptor and artist, known for his heroic monuments. 
Ognjeslav Kostović Stepanović, Serbian inventor who also lived in Russia.
Dositej Obradović, Serbian writer and philosopher who resided in Imperial Russia for a short period in the second half of the 18th century.
Milla Jovovich, Hollywood actress
Đorđe Lobačev (1909-2002), Russian and Serbian comic strip author and illustrator

See also

Russia-Serbia relations
Russians in Serbia

References

Sources
Atnagulov, R.E.I., 2017. Demographic characteristics of the Serbs in Russia. Nasleđe, Kragujevac, 14(37-1), pp. 27–31.
 

Russia

Russia
Immigration to Russia
Russia
Russia